The Comisana, also known as Faccia Rossa and Lentinese, is an Italian breed of domestic sheep indigenous to central and northern areas of the Mediterranean island of Sicily. Its name derives from that of the comune of Comiso, in the province of Ragusa. It is raised principally in the provinces of Caltanissetta, Enna and Palermo, but is found in many other Italian provinces and has also been exported to other Mediterranean countries.

History

The origins of the Comisana sheep are obscure; it is a southern Mediterranean breed. It appears to derive from cross-breeding of the Sicilian Pinzirita with Maltese sheep imported to Sicily towards the end of the nineteenth century. 

It is one of the seventeen autochthonous Italian sheep breeds for which a genealogical herdbook is kept by the Associazione Nazionale della Pastorizia, the Italian national association of sheep-breeders; the herdbook was established in 1976. Total numbers for the breed were estimated at 350,000 in 1983, of which 64,500 were registered in the herdbook. In 2013 the number recorded in the herdbook was 28,428; in 2019 it was 2105.

Use

It may exceed  The milk has 6.5% fat and 5.2% protein.

References

Sheep breeds originating in Italy